This is a list of world championships medalists in women's powerlifting.

The various federations of powerlifting have their own championships. The International Powerlifting Federation's (IPF) recognition by the International Olympic Committee as the official governing body, as well its longevity has resulted in their championships being deemed the official world championships, and the results of these are shown below. However, other respected federations have had their own world champions also (much as boxing world champions are divided among a myriad of organizations). For world champions associated with other federations see the articles for those federations for more information.

Current categories - Classic

-47 kg

-52 kg

-57 kg

-63 kg

-72 kg / -69 kg

-76 kg

-84 kg

84+ kg

Current categories - Equipped

Category 47 kg - Equipped

Category 52 kg - Equipped

Category 57 kg - Equipped

Category 63 kg - Equipped

Category 72 kg - Equipped

Category 84 kg - Equipped

Category +84 kg - Equipped

Old categories (Pre 2011)

Category 44 kg

Category 48 kg

Category 52 kg

Category 56 kg

Category 60 kg

Category 67.5 kg

Category 75 kg

Category 82.5 kg

Category +82.5 kg

Category 90 kg

Category +90 kg

See also
List of world championships medalists in powerlifting (men)

References
Meet results IPF at en.allpowerlifting.com (several results)
IPF Results of World Championships  Official Results

Goodlift.info
Goodlift database - IPF Results of World Championships Official Results
Goodlift database of IPF lifters Individual World Championships Results Official Results

List

Powerlifting World Championships women